Dysmelia (from the Greek , "bad" + , "limb" + English suffix -ia) is a congenital disorder of a limb resulting from a disturbance in embryonic development.

Types

Dysmelia can refer to 
 missing (aplasia) limbs: amelia, oligodactyly, congenital amputation e.g. tibial or radial aplasia
 malformation of limbs: shortening (micromelia, rhizomelia or mesomelia), ectrodactyly, phocomelia, meromelia, syndactyly, brachydactyly, club foot
 too many limbs: polymelia, polydactyly, polysyndactyly
 others: tetraamelia, hemimelia, symbrachydactyly

Occurrence rate 
Birth defects involving limbs occur in 1 per 1000.

Causes 
Dysmelia can be caused by
 Inheritance of abnormal genes, e.g. polydactyly, ectrodactyly or brachydactyly, symptoms of deformed limbs then often occur in combination with other symptoms (syndromes)
 external causes during pregnancy (thus not inherited), e.g. via amniotic band syndrome
 teratogenic drugs (e.g. thalidomide, which causes phocomelia) or environmental chemicals
 ionizing radiation (nuclear weapons, radioiodine, radiation therapy)
 infections
 metabolic imbalance

Syndromes with dysmelia

 2p15-16.1 microdeletion syndrome
 Achard syndrome
 Ackerman syndrome
 Acrocallosal syndrome
 Acropectoral syndrome
 Adams–Oliver syndrome
 Aglossia adactylia
 Amniotic band syndrome
 Apert syndrome
 Autosomal recessive Robinow syndrome
 Basel–Vanagaite–Sirota syndrome (Microlissencephaly-Micromelia syndrome)
 Campomelic dysplasia
 Cardiofaciocutaneous syndrome
 Catel–Manzke syndrome
 Cenani–Lenz syndrome
 Corneodermatoosseous syndrome
 Diploid triploid mosaic
 Ectrodactyly–ectodermal dysplasia–cleft syndrome
 Edwards syndrome
 Ellis–Van Creveld syndrome
 Fibular dimelia diplopodia syndrome (Leg duplication mirror foot syndrome)
 Greig cephalopolysyndactyly syndrome
 Haas syndrome
 Hanhart syndrome
 Holt–Oram syndrome
 Humeroradial synostosis
 Johnson–Munson syndrome
 Joubert syndrome
 McKusick–Kaufman syndrome
 Mermaid syndrome
 Mesomelia-Synostoses syndrome (8q13 microdeletion syndrome)
 Microgastria
 Myhre syndrome
 Nager acrofacial dysostosis
 Neu–Laxova syndrome
 Patau syndrome
 Pfeiffer syndrome
 Poland syndrome
 Radial aplasia
 Roberts SC-Phocomelia syndrome (Phocomelia syndrome)
 Rubinstein–Taybi syndrome
 Silver–Russell syndrome
 Split-hand split-foot malformation (SHFM)
 TAR syndrome (thrombocytopenia with absent radius)
 Tetra-amelia syndrome
 Ulbright–Hodes syndrome
 VACTERL association
 Wallis–Zieff–Goldblatt syndrome

References

External links
 DysNet: An organisation for people affected by Dysmelia (congenital limb difference)
 Reach: Association for Children with Upper Limb Deficiency)

Congenital disorders of musculoskeletal system
Supernumerary body parts